Montorso Vicentino is a town and comune in the province of Vicenza, Veneto, Italy. It is south of SP31 provincial road.

References

Sources
(Google Maps)

Cities and towns in Veneto